= Judith Eagle =

English children's writer

Judith Eagle is an English children's historical mystery writer.

== Biography ==
Judith Eagle grew up in London, the daughter of librarians. She worked as a stylist, fashion editor and features writer before completing an MA in Children's Literature at Birkbeck University.

== Writing ==
Her first, second and forth novels, The Secret Starling The Pear Affair and The Stolen Songbird, are set in the more recent past (1970s, 60s, 50s respectively), whereas her third novel, The Accidental Stowaway, is set in the early part of the 20th century.

== Published works ==
Title	Year	Publisher
The Secret Starling	2019	Faber & Faber
The Pear Affair	2020	Faber & Faber
The Accidental Stowaway	2022	Faber & Faber
The Stolen Songbird	2023	Faber & Faber
